Boa Vista−Atlas Brasil Cantanhede International Airport  is the airport serving Boa Vista, Brazil. Since April 13, 2009 the airport is named after Atlas Brasil Cantanhede (1917-1973), a pilot and politician who in the 1950s pioneered aviation in Roraima state. It is the northernmost Brazilian airport served by scheduled flights.

It is operated by Vinci SA.

Some of its facilities are shared with Boa Vista Air Force Base of the Brazilian Air Force.

History
The airport was opened on February 19, 1973, and underwent its first renovation in 1998. The runway, terminal and the apron were then enlarged.

Previously operated by Infraero, on April 7, 2021 Vinci SA won a 30-year concession to operate the airport.

Airlines and destinations

Access

See also

List of airports in Brazil
Boa Vista Air Force Base

References

External links

Airports in Roraima
Airports established in 1973
Boa Vista, Roraima
1973 establishments in Brazil